Another Level is the second album by American R&B group Blackstreet. Released in September 10, 1996, it was the first album with new members Eric Williams and Mark Middleton. They joined the group after replacing departed members Dave Hollister and Levi Little. Another Level was also the first Blackstreet album released under Interscope Records' new distribution deal with MCA Music Entertainment, Inc. after the company was dropped by Time Warner several months before the release of the album.

Another Level was Blackstreet's most commercially successful album, reaching No. 3 on the Billboard 200 albums chart, and No. 1 on the Top R&B Albums chart for five weeks and selling over 4 million copies. It contained the group's biggest hit to date, the Billboard Hot 100 No. 1 single "No Diggity".

Despite Another Level being their most successful recording and the huge success of the single "No Diggity", member/producer Teddy Riley stated in a 2013 interview with BBC Radio 1Xtra host Ronnie Herel that the album didn't have a signature song.

Track listing

Charts

Weekly charts

Year-end charts

Certifications

Credits

 Dr. Dre
 Queen Pen
 Beverly Crowder
 Karen Anderson
 Shaquanna Elam
 Darryl Adams
 ELAN
 Lamenga Ford (Kafi)
 Shannon Cooper
 Deja
 Taja (vocals)
 William Stewart
 Sprague Williams
 Serban Ghenea
 George Mayers
 John Haynes
 Eric Williams
 Wesley Hoggs
 Tommy Sims (various instruments)
 Frank "Nitty" Pimental
 Roosevelt Harrell (programming)
 Madeline Nelson (A&R and Manager)

See also 
 List of number-one R&B albums of 1996 (U.S.)

References 

Blackstreet albums
1996 albums
Albums produced by Teddy Riley